All About Men is a CD which is presented by Universal Music and produced by TVB Music Limited. The songs in this CD are all by male actors. This CD was produced in April 2005.

Songs

2005 compilation albums